Vlastimil Lenert (born 20 February 1950) is a Czech volleyball player. He competed at the 1976 Summer Olympics and the 1980 Summer Olympics.

References

1950 births
Living people
Czech men's volleyball players
Olympic volleyball players of Czechoslovakia
Volleyball players at the 1976 Summer Olympics
Volleyball players at the 1980 Summer Olympics